Korgi is a 2007 American children's graphic novel series written and illustrated by former Disney animator Christian Slade and published by Top Shelf Productions. It is set in a fantasy world in which "Mollies" (fairy-like beings) bear close relationships with their pet Korgis.The series focuses on a young Mollie, Ivy, and her Korgi cub, Sprout, and their adventures in and around Korgi Hollow. It is similar to Owly, another graphic novel published by Top Shelf Productions, in the absence of dialogue. Thus far, three volumes have been published, with volumes 5 and 6 in the works. Book 4 was published on October 25, 2016.

References

American children's novels
American graphic novels
2007 graphic novels
2007 comics debuts
Series of children's books
Pantomime comics
Fantasy comics
Fictional fairies and sprites
2007 children's books